Niraparaadhi is a 1984 Indian Tamil-language crime film, directed by K. Vijayan and produced by K. Balaji. The film stars Mohan and Madhavi. It is a remake of the Hindi film Be Abroo, and was released on 15 August 1984.

Plot 

Aruna elopes with Jayaprakash. They come to Jayaprakash's house where his father, Durai Raj accepts them wholeheartedly. Later, Durai Raj attempts to rape Aruna and reveals to her that Jayaprakash is not his son but a pimp who sold her to him. She tries to escape but is unsuccessful. Jayaprakash also tells her that he married many other girls and sold them. Feeling devastated, Aruna kills herself.

Radha reaches madras to begin her job as a chief reporter. She tries to contact her friend Ratna, who is supposed to pick her up at the bus station. She meets a man there who offers her tea. After drinking it, she falls unconscious. The man is a pimp who wanted to abduct her and sell her to four men on the same night. When the pimp physically tortures her she kills him with a razer. Later she escapes from the place with the murder weapon. Inspector Raja is assigned to investigate the murder of the pimp. Upon reaching Ratna's place Radha realises that on the way to the bus station, Ratna couldn't reach the bus station as she was attacked by goons and in the process of snatching her chain they make her unconscious. Inspector Raja is investigating this as well. He comes to Ratna's house to show the suspects photographs and meets Radha there. They were college classmates in love. Radha receives appreciation at her workplace for her articles. The editor asks her to cover a conference on women's security. She is impressed with the chief guest, physicist Janaki's speech there. Raja wants to rekindle his relationship with Radha, but she denies it due to the rape that happened to her.

A man, Vicky runs a brothel in the name of a massage parlour and asks a girl, Meena to get ready for mafia leader Jana, who is supposed to wait for her at a hotel. Meena denies it as Jana is a sadist, but Vicky forcefully takes her to the hotel. Radha reached the same hotel for an interview and sees Vicky and Meena there. She gets suspicious and follows them. Raja with his subordinate Balan, reaches the same hotel to arrest drug peddler, Jana.  The hotel receptionist informs Jana about the police and he attempts to flee. Radha kills him with the same razor in the elevator. While leaving the hotel, Balan notices her. Raja finds Meena in Jana's room. He reaches with a lady constable, Ratnavally at Vicky's brothel and gets information about him from the girls there. Meena informs him that Vicky might be at Durairaj’s beach restaurants and that he is the leader of the pimps. After getting the confirmation about Vicky, Durairaj and other pimps including Jayaprakash, Raja and his team raid the beach restaurant. Durairaj, Vicky and Jayaprakash escape, but others get caught. After reading news about pimps in a newspaper, a dancer, Rakhi contacts Raja and informs Vicky's whereabouts. Raja and Vally disguise themselves as performers at rakhi’s dance show to arrest Ricky. Vicky and others get arrested. During interrogation, Vicky denies killing Jana. Radha has been told to attend a cabaret function of Shailaja to get some news. She interviews Shailaja and meets Durairaj there and has a verbal spat with him. Durairaj follows Radha on the road, and she kills him with the razor she used in a previous murder. Since Vicky was in jail during Durairaj‘s murder with the same weapon, police assume he didn't kill Jana and ask him to leave. Vicky is afraid that he will be killed too, so he refuses to leave the police station. But the police do not allow him to stay back. Vicky is later found murdered in a car. Radha had decided to kill all the pimps to eliminate prostitution. Other pimps decide to stay quiet and stop prostitution to avoid further deaths.

Raja wants to marry Radha and takes her to his mother. She tries to reveal the truth to Raja, but he refuses to listen. Radha comes to Janaki for advice. She wants to tell Raja about the rape cases. Janaki advises her to forget the past and start a new life with Raja. On the day of marriage, Shailaja comes to congratulate Radha and finds a photo of Radha with Aruna. Radha tells that Aruna is her younger sister who eloped with someone and her mother's suicide was due to that. Shailaja was present during Aruna's suicide and reveals all the truth to Radha. Radha gets to know from Shailaja that Jayaprakash, the reason for Aruna's death, is in the hotel rainbow. Radha leaves the wedding to kill him. She goes to Jayaprakash and introduces herself as Rani,  a prostitute from Vicky's brothel. She seduces him and manages to get him tied. She reveals to him her relationship with Aruna and that she is the one who killed the pimps. She kills him and while leaving the room, she is spotted by a waiter. The hotel staff stop her from escaping. The police, Raja, his mother, Balan, and Ratna also reach there. Raja confronts Radha about the murders. She informs the reason behind the murders. Raja assures her that he will stand by her in any situation and will marry her. But Radha refuses to surrender and tells that instead of standing as a criminal before the law, she wants to die as a niraparaadhi (innocent). She cuts her neck with the same murder weapon and dies in Raja’s arms.

Cast 
Mohan as Inspector Raja
Madhavi as Radha
V. K. Ramasamy (guest appearance)
R. S. Manohar as Durai Raj
K. Vijayan
Nizhalgal Ravi as Jayaprakash
Sangili Murugan
Ennathe Kannaiah
Manorama
Sathyakala
Rani Padmini as Aruna
Nalinikanth
Suresh Gopi as Inspector Balan
Silk Smitha as Shailaja
Anuradha

Production 
Niraparaadhi is the Tamil debut of Malayalam actor Suresh Gopi.

Soundtrack 
The soundtrack was composed by Shankar–Ganesh.

Release and reception 
The film faced censorship issues prior to its release. Jeyamanmadhan of Kalki said that, after watching the film, one might start seeing all men in Chennai as pimps.

References

External links 
 

1980s Tamil-language films
1984 crime films
1984 films
Censored films
Films directed by K. Vijayan
Films scored by Shankar–Ganesh
Indian crime films
Indian rape and revenge films
Tamil remakes of Hindi films